The Football Association of Brunei Darussalam (abbrev: FABD) is the governing body of football in Brunei, controlling the Brunei national football team.

History 

FABD is the successor organisation of the Brunei Football Association (BAFA) that was banned by FIFA and AFC in 2009 for government interference. At its meeting on May 30, 2011, the Fifa Executive Committee, presided over by president Joseph S. Blatter, resolved to remove the suspensions against the football associations of Bosnia-Herzegovina (FFBH) and Brunei Darussalam.

In July 2021, it rebranded into its current name, omitting the word "National". The association was also previously known as the National Football Association of Brunei Darussalam (NFABD). The decision was made in order to firmly reflect on the association's objective of producing innovative and substantial advancements to increase the sport's viability. Additionally, it will reflect the association's development and progress since its founding in 2011. There was also a new logo introduced.

On 2 March 2016, the AFC has presented the NFABD with the Grassroots Award for Aspiring Member Association at the first AFC Grassroots Conference this week in Kuala Lumpur. As a substitute for the 2020 Brunei Super League, which was canceled on 19 September 2020 after just two matches owing to COVID-19, the 2020 FA Cup scheduled to begin on 1 November 2020 was canceled. Following the recent lessening of lockdown due to the COVID-19 pandemic, the association plans to resume football in the nation on 12 June 2020.

The NFABD plans to build a new Technical Centre and a Mini Grandstand inside of their complex with a budget of US$2.1 million. The first Technical Centre with facilities for football practice and games for the National Football Association of Brunei Darussalam (NFABD) has started construction on 14 June 2021. The B$3.9 million technical center, which is entirely sponsored by the FIFA Forward Development Programme, is anticipated to give young people greater possibilities to hone their footballing abilities. Considering the time needed to adapt to the new standards once the country started to open its activities once more, the FABD opted to stop the 2021 Brunei Super League.

Youth Development Programmes 
The FABD focuses on football development and operates national age group programmes with U-23, U-21, U-19 and U-17 teams (known as Tabuan Muda). 

Two additional leagues were added; Brunei Under 18 Youth League and Brunei Under 15 Youth League.

The NFABD detailed its plans to coordinate grassroots football events throughout 2019, through the Technical Development Department's Grassroots Development Unit. Additionally, the association and the Brunei Shell Recreation Club (BSRC) organized the "NFABD U6/U8 and U10 Grassroots Football Festival 2019 in celebration of AFC Grassroots Football Day" as part of an ongoing initiative to support the development of the youth's football skills and talents.

List of presidents 

 Abdul Rahman Mohiddin (2011–2013)
 Sufri Bolkiah (2013–2019)
 Matusin Matasan (2019–present)

FABD Congress 
There are 20 congress members in FABD, all of them are affiliated with clubs in the Brunei Super League. The Tutong football association, Kuala Belait clubs, Temburong clubs, MS PDBD, MS ABDB, and the referee cast the 20 ballots.

FABD Tournaments

 Hassanal Bolkiah Trophy
 Brunei FA Cup
 Brunei Super Cup
 Brunei Super League
 Brunei Premier League
 Brunei District Leagues
 Brunei Under 18 Youth League
 NFABD Under-16 Youth Football League
 Brunei Under 15 Youth League
 NFABD Under-12 Futsal Tournament

Brunei M-League/M-Cup Team 

On 16 June 2012, the proposal of having a Bruneian team play in the M-League has been rejected by the NFABD. Prior to now, the NFABD had inquired about participating in the M-League and, ideally, having direct entry to the top division, the Malaysia Super League. But according to the Football Association of Malaysia (FAM), in 2013 all new recruits must go through the procedure of beginning in the third-tier FAM League.

See also 
 Football in Brunei

References

External links
 Brunei at AFC website
 Brunei at FIFA website

Football in Brunei
Sports organizations established in 2011
Brunei Darussalam
2011 establishments in Brunei